These are the results of 2021 BWF World Senior Championships' 45+ events.

Men's singles 

 Fernando Silva (fourth round)
 Christophe Lionne (fourth round)
 K. A. Aneesh (fourth round)
 Carsten Loesch (quarter-finals)
 Reinhard Hechenberger (third round)
 Carl Jennings (quarter-finals)
 Johnny Hast Hansen (fourth round)
 Morten Aarup (third round)
 Stan de Lange (third round)
 Vladislav Druzchenko (withdrew)
 Mark Mackay (bronze medalist)
 Björn Schneider (second round)
 Ulf Svenson (silver medalist)
 Fabrice Bernabé (withdrew)
 Mikael Nilsson (fourth round)
 Gregers Schytt (gold medalist)

Finals

Top half

Section 1

Section 2

Section 3

Section 4

Bottom half

Section 5

Section 6

Section 7

Section 8

Women's singles

Seeds 

 Georgy van Soerland-Trouebrach (gold medalist)
 Rebecca Pantaney (silver medalist)
 Majken Asmussen (bronze medalist)
 Marielle van der Woedrt (third round)
 María Jesús Almagro (quarter-finals)
 Eva Lindqvist (second round)
 Reni Molla-Hassan (second round)
 Fränzi Striebel (quarter-finals)

Finals

Top half

Section 1

Section 2

Bottom half

Section 3

Section 4

Men's doubles

Seeds 

 Mikael Nilsson / Ulf Svenson (bronze medalist)
 Morten Aarup / Carsten Loesch (quarter-finals)
 Jong Yi-huang / Wu Chang-jun (second round)
 K. A. Aneesh / Vijay Lancy Mascarenhas (gold medalist)
 Joy T. Antony / Pradeep Kumar K. S. (third round)
 Carl Jennings / Mark King (quarter-finals)
 Taimar Talts / Tanel Talts (third round)
 Johnny Hast Hansen /  Mark Mackay (silver medalist)

Finals

Top half

Section 1

Section 2

Bottom half

Section 3

Section 4

Women's doubles

Seeds 

 Marielle van der Woerdt / Georgy van Soerland-Trouerbach (gold medalists)
 Majken Asmussen /  Lynne Campbell (bronze medalists)
 Janne Vang Nielsen / Birgitte Pedersen (silver medalists)
 Rebecca Pantaney / Lynne Swan (bronze medalists)

Finals

Top half

Section 1

Section 2

Bottom half

Section 3

Section 4

Mixed doubles

Seeds 

 Vadim Nazarov / Olga Kuznetsova (quarter-finals)
 Morten Aarup / Lene Struwe Andersen (silver medalists)
 Fernando Silva / Maria Gomes (bronze medalists)
 Carsten Loesch /  Elizabeth Austin (quarter-finals)
 Gerben Bruijstens / Georgy van Soerland-Trouerbach (gold medalists)
 Kennet Herløv / Birgitte Pedersen (quarter-finals)
 Mikael Nilsson / Dora Harfman Bromée (quarter-finals)
 Anders Steenkjær / Janne Vang Nielsen (bronze medalists)

Finals

Top half

Section 1

Section 2

Bottom half

Section 3

Section 4

References 
Men's singles
Women's singles
Men's doubles
Women's doubles
Mixed doubles

2021 BWF World Senior Championships